Factoría de Ficción (Spanish: "Fiction Factory") was a Spanish cable/satellite TV channel specialising in drama programmes. It started operations on June 19, 2000, and was available through satellite platform Digital+ and cable operator ONO. Factoría de Ficción was owned by Globomedia, Grupo Antena 3 and Gestevisión Telecinco.

Factoría de Ficción broadcast mostly Spanish TV shows but also some international programming. The episodes of Spanish series were broadcast by this channel about 1–2 weeks after they premiered on Antena 3 and Telecinco.

It broadcast series such as 7 vidas, Los Serrano, Mis adorables vecinos, Hospital Central, Motivos Personales and The Tribe, as well as older series like Manos a la Obra and Antivicio and the Canadian series Are You Afraid of the Dark?.

FDF closed on June 1, 2007.

External links
Official site 

Defunct television channels in Spain
Television channels and stations disestablished in 2007
Television channels and stations established in 2000